Cadiz is a composition by Isaac Albéniz, originally written for piano. After the composer's death, his publisher included it in an enlarged edition of the Suite española. The suite comprises pieces with geographical titles; in this case the title refers to the Spanish city of Cádiz or its province.

Version for Guitar
Since it has been transcribed for classical guitar by Miguel Llobet, it has become one of the most important works of the classical guitar repertoire. It has been played and recorded by guitarists such as Julian Bream and John Williams and many others. It is a patriotic, bright sounding piece, generally played in the key of A major.

References

External links
 Cadiz, by John Williams

Compositions by Isaac Albéniz
Spanish compositions for solo piano
Compositions for guitar